It's a New Day – Let a Man Come In is the 29th studio album by American musician James Brown. The album was released in June 1970, by King Records.

Track listing
All tracks composed by James Brown; except where indicted

References

1970 albums
James Brown albums
Albums produced by James Brown
King Records (United States) albums